Furius Baco is a hydraulically launched steel roller coaster located at PortAventura Park in the resort PortAventura World, Salou, Catalonia, Spain. Manufactured by Intamin, the ride opened on June 5, 2007 as the fastest roller coaster in Europe at 83.9 mph, which the ride reaches in 3 seconds, although this record has since been surpassed by Red Force at neighboring Ferrari Land. 
Since opening, the ride has experienced some technical problems, and as a result has had to shut down for varying periods of time during opening hours.

Description
Furius Baco has the shortest height of any Intamin Accelerator Coaster, at 46 feet tall.  Furius Baco is 850 meters long, lasts 55 seconds and cost 15 million euros to build.

It features several large turns, with a long inline twist, and a finale turn over the lake. The ride also features a different seating arrangement to other Intamin Accelerator coasters, where the seats are attached to the side of the barrel themed trains. This gives the riders the ultimate floorless feeling, with no track beneath or above them. This arrangement has now been commonly dubbed as 'wing rider' trains. Each of the three trains have 6 cars, with two riders seated on each side of the track, allowing each train to hold 24 passengers. The seating style, being off the track rather than above or below, differs from many roller coasters and thus the outside seats can be somewhat rough.

Ride experience

Once all the riders have been loaded onto the barrel themed side cars the train will slowly advance out of the station area and into the pre-show area; a laboratory style area with many whirling cogs and running machinery. The sound of a bike bell goes off which cues the entrance of the professors assistant, a monkey which cycles over the left hand side of the lab on a skybike. A video is shown, revealing a machine which is supposed to collect grapes for wine, and the professor is seen climbing down a ladder and removes a large spanner out of his lab coat. At this point the monkey appears to the left, holding a lever whilst the professor adds the finishing touches to his machine. The professor then notices the monkey, and shouts "No, No!" However, it is too late and the monkey pulls the lever, sending the professor flying into the cog machine; he is thrown around the laboratory, trapped in the cogs of the machine. At this point, the machine explodes, flooding the screen with wine. The cars then move forwards then back again, and on the screen the professor dives through the wine and then the ride launches without warning from 0-83mph in 3 seconds up a small hill before navigating a series of tight turns and transitions through the vineyard and a tunnel. The ride then dives into an inline twist before dropping and twisting through a turn very close to the lake before rising up and going into the brake run where the monkey is hanging on the ceiling holding some grapes. Then the riders are let off the ride and into the shop where they can purchase an onride photo or a video of their ride. The ride is known for giving a particularly rough experience, especially in the outer seats.

Roller coasters in Spain
Roller coasters introduced in 2007